Yusupha Ngum is a singer and songwriter from Gambia, also known by the stage name "Joloffman". He has performed in a variety of styles, including mbalax, folk music, rap, jazz fusion, and Afro fusion music. Yusupha is currently based in Australia.

Life

Yusupha's father was Musa Ngum (also often spelled "Moussa Ngom"). Musa Ngum was a griot, and a highly successful singer in Gambia and Senegal. Yusupha followed in the griot tradition of his father.

When he was growing up, Yusupha went to a Franco-Arab school in Senegal.

Career

Yusupha started his music career by co-founding the rap band Galaxy Crew in 1998. With Galaxy Crew, Yusupha released three albums, Bamba (2000), Peace and Blessings (2001) and Toloff-Toloff (2004).

Yusupha started his solo career in 2005, where he shifted to creating mbalax music. As a solo artist, Yusupha released his first album in 2006, titled Ndigal.

In 2007, Yusupha went on a two-month tour of Sweden.

In 2009, Yusupha released his second solo album, titled Yaay Borom, which reached no. 3 on the Gambian album charts.

In 2015, Yusupha released his third solo album, Golden Jubilee, to celebrate the 50th year of Gambia's independence.

In 2013, Yusupha along with two partners formed the Australia-based trio Jaaleekaay. In 2016, Jaaleekaay released their self-titled album. In its review of the 2016 National Folk Festival, Scenestr described Jaaleekaay as "the band of the festival".

Yusupha is currently based in Melbourne, Australia, and is the lead singer of Yusupha Ngum and the Affia Band and was the original lead singer of the band Ausecuma Beats.

In 2018, Yusupha Ngum & the Affia Band recorded a song, "Gainde", to celebrate the Senegal team's qualification in the 2018 FIFA World Cup. The song was widely reported in the Gambian and Senegalese media.

In July 2018, Yusupha appeared as part of an ensemble shot on the cover of Beat Magazine, representing the band Ausecuma Beats.

After a performance at the Healesville Music Festival, the chair of the festival nominated the set by Yusupha Ngum & the Affia Band as one of the "stand out" performances, and named the band as one of three he listed as "among some of the big names that really pulled the crowds".

In 2019, Yusupha Ngum & the Affia Band included jazz fusion music in their repertoire at the Castlemaine Jazz Festival.

In 2019, Ausecuma Beats released their self-titled EP, and released their self-titled album in 2020, with Yusupha on lead vocals on every track except for one vocal track and one instrumental track. Yusupha Ngum left Ausecuma Beats in 2020.

Accomplishments and awards

In 2009, Yusupha won the award for the "Most Radio Played Artist Male" category at the Gamspirit Music Awards.

In 2015, Yusupha was nominated for both the "Best Mbalax Artist" and "Best Traditional Artist" categories of the Purely Gambian Entertainment awards.

Partial Discography

Solo
Albums:
 2006  Ndigal
 2009 Yaay Borom (#3 Gambia album chart)
 2015 Golden Jubilee

With Galaxy Crew
Albums:
 2000  Bamba
 2001  Peace and Blessings
 2004  Toloff-Toloff

With Jaaleekaay
Albums:
 2016  Jaaleekaay

With Yusupha Ngum & the Affia Band
Singles:
 2018 Gaïndé

With Ausecuma Beats
Albums:
 2019 Ausecuma Beats (EP)
 2020 Ausecuma Beats (album)
Singles:
 2019 Aida (#2 Amrap Metro Chart)
 2020 Yelena
 2020 Cherie

With Vellúa
Singles:
 2019 Ibra Fall

Partial Videography

Solo
 Fans
 2016 Fatou Remix
 2017 Don Sa Bopp (with Jaliba Kuyateh and Tuti Sanyang)
 2021 Maam Bamba Jerejeff (a capella)

With Galaxy Crew
 Mariama
 Fatou

With Yusupha Ngum & the Affia Band
 2016 Taysito
 2016 Citizens of this World
 2018 Gaïndé

References 

Living people
Gambian Muslims
Gambian singers
21st-century Australian male singers
Wolof-language singers
Year of birth missing (living people)
People from Banjul
Serer singers